Amorepacific Corporation is a South Korean beauty and cosmetics chaebol, operating more than 30 beauty, personal care, and health brands including Sulwhasoo, Laneige, Mamonde, Etude House, AMOREPACIFIC and Innisfree. The firm was founded in 1945 by Suh Sung-whan and currently managed by Suh Kyung-bae, the son of the founder. It is the second-largest cosmetics company in South Korea and one of the 10 largest cosmetics companies in the world.

History 
The company originated back in the 1930s, when Madame Yun Dok-jeong began selling camellia oil in the village of Kaesong. Her second son, Suh Sung-whan, took over the business in 1945 and transformed the firm into a cosmetics chaebol, naming it "taepyeongyang (meaning Pacific Ocean in Korean)".

Suh Sung-whan handed the company over to his second son Suh Kyung-bae in 1997. Suh rebranded the firm into Amorepacific to target the global market and turned the company into a chaebol giant that manages dozens of cosmetics brands.

In 2000, the company established the Korea Breast Cancer Foundation. In 2002 the company was renamed AmorePacific. Four years later, the holding company AmorePacific Group was founded. In 2010, the company built a second R&D center. Forbes named AmorePacific one of the most innovative companies in the world.

Brands

Aestura
Amorepacific
Amos Professional
Aritaum
Dantrol
Espoir
Etude House
Fresh Pop
Goutal Paris
Hanyul
Happy Bath
HERA
ILLIYOON
Innisfree
IOPE
Laneige
LIRIKOS
Makeon
Mamonde
Median
MIRAEPA
Mise-en-Scène
Odyssey
Osulloc
Primera
Ryo
Songyeum
Sulwhasoo
Vital Beautie
EASY PEASY
Bro & Tips
Be Ready

See also
 Pacific Park Villart

References

External links

 

 
Chaebol
Cosmetics companies of South Korea
Manufacturing companies based in Seoul
Chemical companies established in 2006
Companies listed on the Korea Exchange
South Korean brands
South Korean companies established in 2006